Stefanie Claire Zadravec (born 1968) is an American playwright. Her full-length plays include Tiny Houses, Colony Collapse, The Electric Baby, Honey Brown Eyes, and Save Me. She has won numerous awards including the Helen Merrill Emerging Playwright Award, Francesca Primus Prize, and the Helen Hayes Award for Outstanding New Play. She is a resident playwright at New Dramatists.

Early life and education
Zadravec, of Slovenian descent, was born in Washington, D. C., and grew up in Chevy Chase, Maryland. As a child, Zadravec and her friends performed plays while playing at her house. She continued performing while attending school. Zadravec attended Connecticut College where she received a B.A. in theater and English.

Plays 

 Honey Brown Eyes (2011)
 The Electric Baby (2013)
 Save Me (2013)
 Colony Collapse (2016)
 Tiny Houses (2018)

Awards 
 Helen Merrill Emerging Playwright Award.
Francesca Primus Prize
Helen Hayes Award for Outstanding New Play
Sustainable Arts Foundation Award
Women in Arts & Media Collaboration Award

Fellowships, grants, and residencies 

 New York Foundation for the Arts (NYFA)
 The Lark
 Playwrights Realm
 Dramatists Guild in 2010–11.
 Sewanee Writers Conference
 New York State Council on the Arts (NYSCA)
 The Edgerton Foundation
 The Ford Foundation
 SPACE at Ryder Farm
 JAWfest
 Theatreworks
 The National Endowment for the Arts (NEA)
 Mellon Foundation
 The Lilly Awards
 Oregon Shakespeare Festival
 The Kennedy Center
 Play Penn
 The Women's Project
 Arts Emerson
 Epic Theatre Ensemble
 The Barrow Group
 New Dramatists

Teaching 
Zadravec teaches at Primary Stages' ESPA, The Dramatists Guild Institute, and Play Penn

References

External links 
 Official website
Stefanie Zadravec at New Dramatists

Connecticut College alumni
20th-century American dramatists and playwrights
American women dramatists and playwrights
21st-century American dramatists and playwrights
American people of Slovenian descent
1968 births
Living people
Actresses from Washington, D.C.
Actresses from New York City
Writers from Brooklyn
American stage actresses
Writers from Washington, D.C.
21st-century American women writers
20th-century American women writers
People from Chevy Chase, Maryland
Bethesda-Chevy Chase High School alumni